

League table

External links
www.srpskaliga.co.yu/voj-rezultati

Serbian League Vojvodina seasons
3
Serb